KF Goblen is a football club based in Kumanovo, North Macedonia. They were recently competing in the Macedonian Second League (West Division).

History
The club was founded in 2012.

References

External links
Goblen Facebook 
Club info at MacedonianFootball 
Football Federation of Macedonia 

Goblen
Association football clubs established in 2012
2012 establishments in the Republic of Macedonia
Goblen